Humberside Probation Trust was a criminal justice agency which protects the public by ensuring offenders are punished and rehabilitated. Humberside was one of 35 probation trusts within England and Wales that were part of the National Offender Management Service (NOMS) and a department of the Ministry of Justice.

Humberside Probation Trust employed 450 members of staff, and managed over 7,500 offenders each year. The caseload total at anyone time was approximately 4,500 offenders, and the trust wrote over 3,900 pre-sentence reports each year for the court.

Vision and values
The statement of purpose for Humberside Probation Trust was: “To make the diverse communities safer by working with others to reduce re-offending, protect the public and support the victims of crime”. It was responsible for the delivery of reports about offenders to the courts and the supervision of offenders in the community. It also delivered programmes and interventions to rehabilitate offenders and reduce the chance of them committing crime in the future.

In the community
Humberside Probation Trust provided the following services to offenders based in the community:
 Community Payback
 Integrated Offender Management
 Interventions
 Offender Management
 Programmes
 Women Offender Services

In courts
Humberside Probation Trust staff worked in each of the magistrates' courts and in the Crown Court. The trust provided a range of services both for the sentencers (Magistrates and Judges) and the offenders who appeared before the courts.

When an offender pleads guilty, the Sentencer had the option to order a report from the probation trust. This was a formal report that included details on why the offence occurred, the circumstances, the offender's personal background and an assessment of the risk of harm and risk of reoffending they may have posed to the public. The Sentencer would then consider the report and the proposals made within it when making their sentencing decision. The report assisted the court to determine the most suitable way of dealing with the offender.

Humberside Probation Trust staff were available within the Courts to handle enquiries and give advice to sentencers, including providing further verbal information to complement a written report.

In prisons
Humberside Probation Trust had some of its staff based in public and private sector prisons. These staff delivered a number of services and interventions which varied from prison to prison to suit the differing needs of the prison inmates. The work of Probation staff in each establishment was specified in a written agreement between the Governor and the chief executive officer.

Prisons used the skills of Probation staff in working with offenders, particularly around risk assessment, risk management and the delivery of offending behaviour programmes. Prisoners were assessed for interventions according to their sentence plan and, if there was evidence of risk to the public being reduced, would in most cases transfer to category 'C' training prisons before release where they would receive resettlement support to help them return to the community without reoffending. As part of preparing for release, prisoners would learn new skills, complete educational courses, and complete offending behaviour programmes. Prisoners which are serving Life sentences may not ever be released.

Public protection
MAPPA is the Multi-Agency Public Protection Arrangement – a set of arrangements to manage the risk posed by the most serious sexual and violent offenders. A statutory requirement, they bring together the Police, Probation and Prison Services in Humberside into what is known as the MAPPA responsible authority.
A number of agencies are under a duty to co-operate with the responsible authority. These include: Local Authority social services, Primary Care Trusts and strategic health authorities, Youth Offending Teams, local housing authorities, registered social landlords, local education authorities, Jobcentre Plus, and electronic monitoring providers. Following the closure of the Trust, Humberside, Lincolnshire & North Yorkshire Community Rehabilitation Company Ltd and the new National Probation Service continue to cooperate with MAPPA.

The purposes of MAPPA are:

 To ensure more comprehensive risk assessments, taking advantage of co-ordinated information sharing across the agencies, 
 and to direct the available resources to best protect the public.

Closure
Following the "Transforming Rehabilitation" criminal justice reform programme set out by the Ministry of Justice, Humberside Probation Trust dissolved on the 1 June 2014. In keeping with the reform programme, the Trust was divided between the Humberside, Lincolnshire and North Yorkshire Community Rehabilitation Company Ltd (HLNY CRC) and the new National Probation Service. Following renationalisation of these providers, provision of probation services in Humberside is now provided by the Yorkshire and the Humber Region of the Probation Service.

References

External links
 Humberside Probation Trust Website
 National Probation Service website
 National Offender Management Service (NOMS) website
 Ministry of Justice website
 Humberside, Lincolnshire and North Yorkshire Community Rehabilitation Company website

Organisations based in the East Riding of Yorkshire
2008 establishments in England
Probation trusts in England